Mara Zini (born 26 October 1979 in Sondalo) is an Italian short track speed skater who won a bronze medal in the 3000m relay at the 2006 Winter Olympics.  She is a cousin of Katia Zini who was on the same medal winning relay team.

References

1979 births
Living people
Italian female speed skaters
Italian female short track speed skaters
Short track speed skaters at the 2002 Winter Olympics
Short track speed skaters at the 2006 Winter Olympics
Olympic short track speed skaters of Italy
Olympic bronze medalists for Italy
Olympic medalists in short track speed skating
Medalists at the 2006 Winter Olympics
People from Sondalo
Sportspeople from the Province of Sondrio